Meredith Township is a township in Cloud County, Kansas, United States.  As of the 2000 census, its population was 77.

History
Meredith Township was created in 1872.

Geography

References

 USGS Geographic Names Information System (GNIS)

External links
 City-Data.com

Townships in Cloud County, Kansas
Townships in Kansas